The 2001 European Nations Cup (ENC) Second Division (a European rugby union competition for national teams)  was contested over a one-year period during which all teams met each other once. Poland was the winner.

Due to European qualify round to RWC 2003 there's no relegation to division 3 and promotion to division 1

Table

Results

See also
 2001 European Nations Cup First Division
 2003 Rugby World Cup – European qualification

2000–01
2000–01 in European rugby union
2000–01 in German rugby union
Germany at the European Nations Cup
rugby union
rugby union
rugby union
rugby union
rugby union
rugby union
rugby union
rugby union
rugby union
rugby union